Paolo Lorenzi was the defending champion, but lost in the semifinals.

Guido Pella won the title, defeating James McGee in the final, 6–3, 6–3.

Seeds

Draw

Finals

Top half

Bottom half

References
 Main Draw
 Qualifying Draw

San Luis Open Challenger Tour - Singles
San Luis Potosí Challenger